Willamette Valley Vineyards is an  American winery located in Turner, Oregon. Named after Oregon's Willamette Valley, the winery is the leading producer of Willamette  Pinot Noir in Oregon, and also produces Chardonnay and Pinot Gris. In 2016, the winery was the largest producer of Riesling wine in the Willamette Valley.

History

Willamette Valley Vineyards was founded by Jim Bernau and Don Voorhies. In 1997 Willamette Valley Vineyards merged with Tualatin Estate Vineyards, which was established by Bill Fuller in 1973.

The winery was established via an early crowdfunding campaign. In 1989, around 1,200 shareholders invested an average of $1,700 each in an unlisted stock offering approved by Oregon regulators. By 1993, the number of shareholders had grown to 4,500 and many shareholders were directly involved with operations, collectively donating 6,000 to 7,000 hours of labor per month. Over 300 shareholders passed an OLCC class to be certified to pour wine in the tasting room. The winery is now listed on the NASDAQ under the symbol WVVI. 

In 2021, the winery hosted the season 18 finale of Bravo's Top Chef: Portland.

Subsidiaries

In 2015, founder Jim Bernau and winery director Christine Clair founded the Oregon Estate Vineyards division to manage subsidiary vineyards.

Since 2007, Willamette Valley Vineyards has managed Elton Vineyards in the Eola-Amity Hills AVA.  Elton Vineyards is primarily planted with Pinot Noir and Chardonnay. In 2017, Willamette Valley Vineyards began selling a boutique wine label under the Elton name.

In 2015, the company purchased new vineyard sites in the Walla Walla Valley AVA for a new subsidiary, "Pambrun Vineyard," named for Bernau's ancestor, Pierre Pambrun, a Walla Walla pioneer. Pambrun produces Cabernet Sauvignon along with other Bordeaux varieties. In 2018, Willamette Valley Vineyards acquired nearby Maison Bleue Winery, previously owned by Jon Meuret, who was also the consulting winemaker for Pambrun Vineyard.

Press coverage

In 2015, Wine Enthusiast named Willamette Valley Vineyards' Whole Cluster Pinot Noir as one of "America's Best Value Pinot Noirs."

The Wall Street Journal included Willamette Valley Vineyards' Pinot Gris in the article, "Why Wine Remains a Great Connector."

References

Further reading

External links
 Official website

Wineries in Oregon
Turner, Oregon
Companies established in 1983
Companies listed on the Nasdaq
Companies based in Marion County, Oregon
1983 establishments in Oregon